The government of Portuguese India started on 12 September 1505, seven years after the Portuguese discovery of the sea route to India by Vasco da Gama, with the nomination of the first Portuguese viceroy Francisco de Almeida, then settled at Cochin. Until 1752, the name India included all Portuguese possessions in the Indian Ocean, from Southern Africa to Southeast Asia, governed – either by a viceroy or governor – from its headquarters, established in Old Goa since 1510. In 1752 Portuguese Mozambique was granted its own government, and in 1844 the Portuguese government of India ceased administering the territory of Portuguese Macau, Solor and Portuguese Timor, seeing itself thus confined to a reduced territorial possessions along the Konkan, Canara and Malabar Coasts, which would further be reduced to the present-day state of Goa and the union territory of Daman. Portuguese control ceased in Dadra and Nagar Haveli in 1954, and finally ceased in Goa in 1961, when the area was occupied by the Republic of India (although Portugal only recognised the occupation after the Carnation Revolution in 1974, by a treaty signed on 31 December 1974). This ended four and a half centuries of Portuguese rule in parts – though tiny – of India.

It may be noted that during the term of the monarchy, the title of the head of the Portuguese government in India ranged from "governor" to "viceroy". The title of viceroy would only be assigned to members of the nobility; it was formally terminated in 1774, although it has later been given sporadically to be decisively ended after 1835, as shown below.

List
The following is a list of rulers during the history of Portuguese India as a viceroyalty or governorship.

(*) – In 1508, King Manuel I of Portugal devised a plan to partition the Portuguese empire in Asia into three separate governments or "high captaincies" – (1) Captain-Major of the seas of Ethiopia, Arabia and Persia, centered at Socotra, was to cover the East African and Arabian-Persian coasts, from Sofala to Diu; (2) Captain-Major of the seas of India, centered at Cochin, was to cover the Indian coast from Diu down to Cape Comorin. Afonso de Albuquerque was Captain-General of the latter. Jorge de Aguiar was made Captain-General of the former. A third high captaincy, covering Asia east of Cape Comorin (yet to be explored) was assigned to Diogo Lopes de Sequeira, who was assigned that year to discover Malacca. The triarchy experiment failed – Aguiar drowned en route, while Sequeira quit the region in 1509, after his debacle at Malacca, leaving Albuquerque sole governor of the whole unpartitioned complex.

(**) – Around 1570, King Sebastian of Portugal tried to partition the Portuguese State of India into three separate governments (much like Manuel's plan of 1508) – a western state based around Sofala (covering the East African coast from Cape Correntes to Cape Guardafui), a central state ruled from Goa (covering the area between the Red Sea and Ceylon, encompassing India, reserved for the "Viceroy") and an eastern state ruled from Malacca (covering Southeast Asia, from Pegu to China). D. António de Noronha was appointed to Goa, António Moniz Barreto to Malacca, and Francisco Barreto (the former India governor) to Sofala.

(***) – Title of Viceroy of Indies extinguished by royal letter in 1771, replaced by Capitão-Geral (Captain-General) of the Indies.

See also
Portuguese India

References

Further reading
 Andrada (undated). The Life of Dom John de Castro: The Fourth Vice Roy of India. Jacinto Freire de Andrada. Translated into English by Peter Wyche. (1664). Henry Herrington, New Exchange, London. Facsimile edition (1994) AES Reprint, New Delhi. .

External links
 Biographies of Portuguese viceroys and governors of India (1550–1640) in Portuguese 

India
Portuguese India
Portuguese India